Ficolin-1, and also commonly termed M-ficolin is a protein that in humans is encoded by the FCN1 gene.

Proteins of the ficolin family consist of a leader peptide, a short N-terminal segment, followed by a collagen-like domain, and a C-terminal fibrinogen-like domain.  The name of ficolin was derived from the latter two domains.  The collagen-like and the fibrinogen-like domains are also found in other proteins such as tenascins, while the former is also found in complement protein C1q and collectins, which include mannose-binding lectin and lung surfactant proteins.  Ficolins selectively recognize acetylated compounds.  M-ficolin encoded by FCN1 is predominantly expressed in the peripheral blood leukocytes, and has been postulated to function as a plasma protein with elastin-binding activity. Several SNPs have been described in the FCN1 gene with impact on serum concentrations of M-ficolin and the ligand binding ability. M-ficolin levels reflect disease activity and predict remission in early rheumatoid arthritis.

References

Further reading

Arthritis Rheum. 2013 Dec;65(12):3045-50. doi: 10.1002/art.38179.
M-ficolin levels reflect disease activity and predict remission in early rheumatoid arthritis.
Ammitzbøll CG1, Thiel S, Jensenius JC, Ellingsen T, Hørslev-Petersen K, Hetland ML, Junker P, Krogh NS, Østergaard M, Stengaard-Pedersen K.

Ficolins